Maria Gloria Macaraeg Macapagal Arroyo (born April 5, 1947), often referred to by her initials PGMA and GMA, is a Filipino academic and politician who previously served as the 14th president of the Philippines from 2001 until 2010. She is currently serving in the congress as a Deputy Speaker since 2022. She is the longest serving president of the Philippines since Ferdinand Marcos. Before her accession to the presidency, she served as the 10th vice president of the Philippines from 1998 to 2001 under President Joseph Estrada, making her the country's first female vice president, despite having run on an opposing ticket. She was also a senator from 1992 to 1998. After her presidency, she was elected as the representative of Pampanga's 2nd district in 2010 and later became the speaker of the House of Representatives from 2018 until her retirement in 2019. She later came out of retirement to be elected as representative of the same district in 2022. She is one of the only 2 Filipinos to hold at least three of the four highest offices in the country: vice president, president, and house speaker, alongside former President Sergio Osmeña.

The daughter of former president Diosdado Macapagal, she studied economics at Georgetown University in the United States, where she began a lasting friendly relationship with her classmate and future U.S. president Bill Clinton. She then became a professor of economics at Ateneo de Manila University, where her eventual successor, President Benigno Aquino III, was one of her students. She entered government in 1987, serving as the assistant secretary and undersecretary of the Department of Trade and Industry upon the invitation of President Corazon Aquino, Benigno's mother.

After Estrada was accused of corruption, Arroyo resigned her cabinet position as secretary of the Department of Social Welfare and Development and joined the growing opposition against the president, who faced impeachment. Estrada was soon forced out from office by the Second EDSA Revolution in 2001, and Arroyo was sworn into the presidency by Chief Justice Hilario Davide, Jr. on January 20 that year. In 2003, the Oakwood mutiny occurred after signs of a martial law declaration were seen under her rule. She was elected to a full six-year term in the controversial 2004 presidential election, and was sworn in on June 30, 2004. Following her presidency, she was elected to the House of Representatives through her home district, making her the second Philippine president—after José P. Laurel—to pursue a lower office after their presidency.

On November 18, 2011, Arroyo was arrested and held at the Veterans Memorial Medical Center in Quezon City under charges of electoral sabotage but released on bail in July 2012. These charges were later dropped for lack of evidence. She was rearrested in October 2012, on charges of misuse of $8.8 million in state lottery funds. She was given a hospital arrest, allegedly due to "life-threatening health conditions" certified by her doctors. During the presidency of Rodrigo Duterte, the Supreme Court acquitted her by a vote of 11–4. Also, the Supreme Court declared the Department of Justice's 'hold departure orders' unconstitutional. Arroyo's lawyers stated afterward that she no longer needed her medical paraphernalia, releasing her from the hospital.

Arroyo is a member of the Philippine Academy of the Spanish Language and supported the teaching of Spanish in the country's education system during her presidency.

On July 23, 2018, Arroyo was elected speaker of the House of Representatives during the Duterte administration, controversially replacing Pantaleon Alvarez. She spearheaded various controversial bills, including a bill that sought to lower the age of criminal liability to 12 years old.

Arroyo is the first president to succeed the presidency by being the child of a previous or former president; her father was Diosdado Macapagal, who served as the country's ninth president between from 1961 to 1965.

Early life
Gloria Macapagal Arroyo was born as Maria Gloria Macaraeg Macapagal on April 5, 1947 in San Juan, Rizal, Philippines, to politician Diosdado Macapagal and his wife, Evangelina Guico Macaraeg Macapagal. She is the sister of Diosdado "Boboy" Macapagal Jr. She has two older siblings from her father's first marriage with Purita de la Rosa, the sister of Rogelio de la Rosa, Arturo Macapagal and Cielo Macapagal Salgado. She was raised mostly in Lubao, Pampanga and during summer vacations, she lived with her maternal grandmother in Iligan City. She is a polyglot, fluent in English, Filipino and several other languages. 

She moved with her family into Malacañang Palace in Manila. A municipality was named in her honor, Gloria, Oriental Mindoro. She attended Assumption Convent for her elementary and high school education, graduating valedictorian in 1964. Arroyo then studied for two years at Georgetown University's Walsh School of Foreign Service in Washington, D.C. where she was a classmate of future United States president Bill Clinton. She then earned her Bachelor of Arts degree in Economics from Assumption College San Lorenzo graduating magna cum laude in 1968.

Personal life
In 1968, Arroyo married lawyer and businessman Jose Miguel Arroyo of Binalbagan, Negros Occidental. They had three children, including Juan Miguel and Diosdado Ignacio Jose Maria (born in 1974). She received a master's degree in economics at the Ateneo de Manila University (1978) and a Ph.D. in economics from the University of the Philippines Diliman (1985). From 1977 to 1987, she held teaching positions in several schools, including the University of the Philippines and the Ateneo de Manila University. She became chairperson of the Economics Department at Assumption College.

In 1987, she was invited by President Corazon Aquino to join the government as assistant secretary of the Department of Trade and Industry. She was promoted to undersecretary two years later. In her concurrent position as executive director of the Garments and Textile Export Board, Arroyo oversaw the rapid growth of the garment industry in the late 1980s.

Senator
Arroyo entered politics in the 1992 election, running for senator. At the first general election under the 1987 Constitution, the top twelve vote-getting senatorial candidates would win a six-year term, and the next twelve candidates would win a three-year term. Arroyo ranked 13th in the elections, earning a three-year term. She was re-elected in 1995, topping the senatorial election with nearly 16 million votes.

As a legislator, Arroyo filed over 400 bills and authored or sponsored 55 laws during her tenure as senator, including the Anti-Sexual Harassment Law, the Indigenous People's Rights Law, and the Export Development Act. The 1995 Mining Act, which allows 100% foreign ownership of Philippine mines, has come under fire from left-wing political groups. Arroyo was also openly against the implementation of capital punishment in the country, advocating instead for better criminal rehabilitation during her time as Senator.

Vice presidency (1998–2001)
Arroyo considered a run for the presidency in the 1998 election, but was persuaded by President Fidel V. Ramos and leaders of the administration party Lakas-NUCD to instead seek the vice-presidency as the running mate of its presidential candidate, House Speaker Jose de Venecia, Jr. Though the latter lost to popular former actor Joseph Estrada, Arroyo won the vice presidency by a large margin, garnering more than twice the votes of her closest opponent, Estrada's running mate Senator Edgardo Angara.

Arroyo began her term as vice president on June 30, 1998, becoming the first female to hold the post. She was appointed by Estrada to a concurrent position in the cabinet as secretary of social welfare and development.

Arroyo resigned from the Cabinet in October 2000, distancing herself from Estrada, who was accused of corruption by a former political supporter, Chavit Singson, Governor of Ilocos Sur. She had initially resisted pressure from allies to speak out against Estrada, but eventually joined calls for Estrada's resignation.

Presidency (2001–2010)

First term (2001–2004)

Succession
The last quarter of 2000 up to the first week of January 2001 was a period of political and economic uncertainty for the Philippines. On January 16, 2001, the impeachment trial also took a new direction. Private prosecutors walked out of the trial when pro-Estrada senators prevented the opening of an evidence (a brown envelope) containing bank records allegedly owned by President Joseph Estrada. With the walkout, the impeachment trial was not completed and Filipinos eventually took to the streets in masses to continue the clamor for President Estrada's resignation.

From January 17 to 20, 2001, hundreds of thousands of Filipinos gathered at Epifanio de los Santos Avenue (EDSA), the site of the original People Power Revolution. The clamor for a change in the presidency gained momentum as various sectors of Philippine society – professionals, students, artists, politicians, leftist and rightist groups – joined what became known as EDSA II. Officials of the administration, the Armed Forces of the Philippines (AFP) and the Philippine National Police (PNP) also withdrew their support for President Estrada.

Days after leaving Malacañang Palace, President Estrada's lawyers questioned the legitimacy of Arroyo's presidency before the Supreme Court. He reiterated that he had not resigned as president and that at most, Arroyo was just serving in an acting capacity. The high court, however, voted unanimously to uphold the legitimacy of Arroyo's succession. As a consequence, Estrada no longer enjoys immunity from charges being filed against him.

In the last week of April 2001, the Sandiganbayan ordered the arrest of Estrada and his son, then mayor Jinggoy Estrada, for plunder charges. A few days later, Estrada supporters protested his arrest, gathered at the EDSA Shrine, and staged what they called, EDSA III – comparing their actions to the People Power revolution of 1986 and January 2001.

Thousands of protesters demanded the release of Estrada. Eventually, they also called for the ouster of Arroyo and the reinstatement of the former. On May 1, 2001, they marched towards Malacañang to force Arroyo to give in to their demands. Violence erupted when the protesters attempted to storm the presidential palace and the military and police were ordered to use their arms to drive them back. Arroyo declared a state of rebellion because of the violence and prominent political personalities affiliated with Estrada were charged and arrested. The so-called EDSA III was the first serious political challenge to the Arroyo presidency.

Corruption charges and Oakwood Mutiny

The Oakwood mutiny occurred in the Philippines on July 27, 2003. A group of 321 armed soldiers who called themselves "Bagong Katipuneros" led by Army Capt. Gerardo Gambala and Navy Lt. Antonio Trillanes IV took over the Oakwood Premier Ayala Center (now Ascott Makati) serviced apartment tower in Makati to show the Filipino people the alleged corruption of the Gloria Macapagal Arroyo administration, believing that the president was going to declare martial law.

2004 presidential election

Article VII Section 4 of the 1987 Constitution explicitly states that the president of the Philippines can only serve for one term. However, the same provision also implicitly states that a president's successor who has not served for more than four years can still seek a full term for the presidency. Although Arroyo fell under this category, she initially announced on December 30, 2002, that she would not seek the presidency in 2004. She emphasized that she would devote her remaining months in office to serving the people and improving the economy of the Philippines.

In October 2003, Arroyo changed her mind and announced that she would contest the May 2004 presidential elections and seek a direct mandate from the people. She explained, "There is a higher cause to change society...in a way that nourishes our future". With her decision, the initial criticisms hurled against Arroyo centered on her lack of word of honor.

As predicted by SWS exit polls, Arroyo won the election by a margin of over one million votes against Poe. However, the congressional canvassing was quite contentious as opposition lawmakers in the National Board of Canvassers argued that there were many discrepancies in the election returns and that insinuations of cheating were raised. On June 23, 2004, Congress proclaimed Arroyo and Noli de Castro as president and vice president, respectively.

Second term (2004–2010)

2004 presidential election rigging allegations

On June 30, 2004, in a break with tradition, Arroyo first delivered her inaugural speech at the Quirino Grandstand in Manila. She then departed for Cebu City for her oath taking, the first time that a Philippine president took the oath of office outside of Luzon.

Allegations of cheating against Arroyo gained momentum one year after the May 2004 elections. In a press conference held on June 10, 2005, Samuel Ong, former deputy director of the National Bureau of Investigation (NBI) claimed to have audio recordings of wiretapped conversations between Arroyo and an official of the Commission on Elections (COMELEC). Virgilio Garcillano, a former COMELEC commissioner, would later be identified as the official talking to Arroyo. According to Ong, the recordings allegedly proved that Arroyo ordered the rigging of the national elections for her to win by around one million votes against Poe.

The recordings of Ong became known as the Hello Garci controversy and triggered massive protests against Arroyo. Key members of her cabinet resigned from their respective posts and urged Arroyo to do the same. On June 27, 2005, Arroyo admitted to inappropriately speaking to a COMELEC official, claiming it was a "lapse in judgement". She, however, denied influencing the outcome of the elections and declared that she won the elections fairly. Arroyo did not resign despite the pressures coming from various sectors of society.

The Hello Garci controversy became the basis of the impeachment case filed against Arroyo in 2005.
Attempts to impeach Arroyo failed later that year. Another impeachment case was filed against Arroyo in 2006 but was also defeated at the House of Representatives.

In October 2007, lawyer Alan Paguia filed an impeachment complaint against Arroyo in connection with the issue of bribery. Paguia's complaint was based on the revelation of Pampanga Governor Ed Panlilio that various governors received half a million pesos from Malacañang. The impeachment case, as of the middle of October 2007, has already been referred to the House of Representatives Committee on Justice.

2006 State of emergency

On February 24, 2006, a plot to take over the government was uncovered by authorities, allegedly headed by Gen. Danilo Lim and other rightist military adventurists. General Lim and some of his men were arrested. To face the threat posed by enemies of the state, Arroyo issued Presidential Proclamation 1017 and used it as basis in declaring a state of emergency throughout the Philippines. According to Arroyo, this declaration was done to quell the military rebellion, stop lawless violence, and promote peace and stability. Presidential Proclamation 1017 also empowered the government to enforce warrantless arrests and take over strategic private utilities companies.

The state of emergency existed for about one week with the purpose of curbing further violence, illegal rallies, and public disturbance throughout the Philippines. The police and the military dispersed demonstrators and protesters, especially those along EDSA. Aside from General Lim, prominent personalities were also arrested in connection with their alleged participation in the attempt to overthrow the government. 

Presidential Proclamation 1017 was lifted on March 3, 2006, but members of the opposition, private lawyers, and concerned citizens challenged its constitutionality before the Supreme Court. On May 4, the high court declared the proclamation constitutional. However, it also said that it was illegal for the government to implement warrantless arrests and seize private institutions and companies.

Charter change
Arroyo currently spearheads a controversial plan for an overhaul of the constitution to transform the present unitary and presidential republic with a bicameral legislature into a federal parliamentary government with a unicameral legislature.

Economy

Arroyo, who earned a master's degree and doctorate in economics, made the Philippine economy the focus of her presidency. Annual economic growth in the Philippines averaged 4.5% during the Arroyo administration, expanding every quarter of her presidency. This is higher than in the administrations of her three immediate predecessors, Corazon Aquino (3.8%), Fidel Ramos (3.7%), and Joseph Estrada (3.7%). The Philippine economy grew at its fastest pace in three decades in 2007, with real GDP growth exceeding 7%. The economy was one of the few to avoid contraction during the 2008 global financial crisis, faring better than its regional peers due to minimal exposure to troubled international securities, lower dependence on exports, relatively resilient domestic consumption, large remittances from four-to five-million overseas Filipino workers, and a growing business process outsourcing industry. Arroyo's handling of the economy has earned praise from former US president Bill Clinton, who cited her "tough decisions" that put the Philippine economy back in shape. Despite this growth, the poverty rate remained stagnant due to a high population growth rate and uneven distribution of income.

A controversial expanded value added tax (e-VAT) law, considered the centerpiece of the Arroyo administration's economic reform agenda, was implemented in November 2005, aiming to complement revenue-raising efforts that could plug the country's large budget deficit. Her administration originally set a target to balance the national budget by 2010. The tax measure boosted confidence in the government's fiscal capacity and helped to strengthen the Philippine peso, making it East Asia's best performing currency in 2005–06. The peso strengthened by nearly 20% in 2007, making it one of Asia's better performing currencies for that year, a fact attributed to a combination of increased remittances from overseas Filipino workers and a strong domestic economy.

Early in her presidency, Arroyo implemented a controversial policy of holiday economics, adjusting holidays to form longer weekends with the purpose of boosting domestic tourism and allowing Filipinos more time with their families.

Domestic policies

Foreign policies

Administration and cabinet

Public perception

The Social Weather Stations public opinion group has conducted quarterly surveys tracking the net satisfaction rating ("satisfied" rating minus "dissatisfied" rating") of President Arroyo. She began her presidency in the first quarter of 2001 with a net satisfaction rating of +24. Her rating first dipped into the negative in the first quarter of 2003, making Arroyo the only president to achieve a negative net satisfaction rating in SWS opinion polling. Her rating rebounded well into the positive in 2004, in time for the presidential election where she won election to a new six-year term. However, net satisfaction sunk back into negative territory in the fourth quarter of 2004, and has remained negative since, dipping as low as −38 in the second quarter of 2008. Her net satisfaction rating in the first quarter of 2009 was −32.

Post-presidency (2010–present)

House of Representatives (2010–2019)

In November 2009, Arroyo formally declared her intention to run for a seat in the House of Representatives representing the 2nd district of Pampanga, making her the second Philippine president – after Jose P. Laurel – to pursue a lower office after the expiration of their presidency. A petition seeking to disqualify Arroyo from the race was dismissed by the COMELEC for lack of merit, a decision which was later affirmed by the Supreme Court. With little serious competition, she was elected to Congress in May 2010 with a landslide victory. After receiving final military honors at the inauguration ceremony of incoming President Benigno Aquino III, she headed straight to San Fernando, Pampanga for her own oath-taking as congresswoman.

Despite being considered the strongest contender for speaker of the House, Arroyo declined to seek the position, hoping instead to take on a role similar to Sonia Gandhi, who was influential as merely the head of her party. On her first day as a lawmaker, Arroyo and her son Dato filed a resolution calling for Congress to call a constitutional convention to propose amendments to the existing constitution.

While still confined in the Veterans Memorial Medical Center for hospital arrest, Arroyo successfully earned a second term as congresswoman for Pampanga's second congressional district at the conclusion of the 2013 Philippine mid-term elections on May 13, 2013, defeating the ruling Liberal Party's Vivian Dabu, who was the provincial administrator under former Governor Ed Panlilio. She was re-elected in 2016 for her third consecutive term, running unopposed.

2011 spinal surgery
In early 2011, Arroyo was diagnosed with cervical spondylosis or cervical radiculopathy. She was rushed to the St. Luke's Medical Center in Taguig on July 25, 2011, minutes after the State of the Nation Address by Benigno Aquino III. Doctors performed a five-hour spine surgery on July 29, 2011. Two more surgeries occurred in August 2011, which aggravated her hypoparathyroidism. The House of Representatives, under the leadership of Speaker Feliciano Belmonte, Jr., issued a travel permit allowing her to have treatment in Germany despite the Department of Justice hold departure order.

2011 hospital arrest
Arroyo was arrested on November 18, 2011, after a Pasay court issued a warrant of arrest against her, following the filing of a complaint for electoral sabotage by the COMELEC. The arrest warrant was served at the St. Luke's Medical Center in Taguig where Arroyo had been confined. Days earlier, the Supreme Court had issued a resolution enjoining attempts by the Department of Justice to prevent her departure from the Philippines to seek medical treatment overseas.

She was transferred to the Veterans Memorial Medical Center in Quezon City on December 9, 2011. Arroyo was released from hospital arrest on bail on July 25, 2012.

On October 29, 2012, she refused to enter any plea on charges she misused $8.8 million in state lottery funds during her term in office. As of December 2013, she was still in custody at the Veterans Memorial Medical Center. On July 19, 2016, the Supreme Court dismissed the corruption charges and ordered her release from the hospital where she had been detained since 2011.

2014 medical problems and reapplication for bail
Arroyo was transported to St. Luke's Medical Center for tests and treatment and returned to confinement at the Veteran's Medical Center after medical incidents in May and June 2014. In June, after the second of these incidents, her attorneys renewed application for bail. In September, a third medical incident caused her to be again rushed to St. Luke's for treatment and returned to confinement at the Veteran's Medical Center.

2015 United Nations Working Group on Arbitrary Detention
In a case filed by human rights lawyer Amal Clooney, the United Nations Working Group on Arbitrary Detention declared Arroyo's hospital detention arbitrary and violative of the international law on human rights. It recognized that the charges against Arroyo were politically motivated since she was detained as a result of her exercise to take part in government and that the detention was arbitrary and illegal under international law because the Sandiganbayan court failed to take into account her individual circumstances when it repeatedly denied her bail.

2016 Supreme Court acquittal
On July 19, 2016, a few weeks after Duterte was sworn in as president, the Supreme Court ruled in favor of the dismissal of plunder case against Arroyo, gathering a vote of 11–4 which was read by spokesperson Theodore Te.

She would later be assigned by Duterte's party, PDP-Laban, as a high-level member of the House of Representatives after winning her third term as congresswoman in the House. She was given committee chairmanships, among many other roles.

House speakership (2018–2019)

Arroyo was elected as the first female speaker of the House of Representatives of the Philippines. The election pushed through on July 23, 2018, due to a controversial majority manifesto and vote that ousted Pantaleon Alvarez. In August 2018, amid rumors that she was gunning to become prime minister under a proposed federal government, which she was advocating in the House, Arroyo stated that she will retire from politics and would not pursue any position after the May 2019 elections.

In January 2019, her speakership passed a House bill which lowered the criminal liability to twelve years old. She had a net satisfaction rating of −4 in September 2018, which further dropped to −21 in January 2019, becoming one of the most unpopular House speakers in Philippine history.

Political retirement
Arroyo, although not holding any elective position, has been participating as a member of Lakas–CMD. As of June 2019, she is working on a memoir narrating her experiences as president, which she plans on limiting to 200 pages for consumption by the general public.

On November 26, 2020, President Rodrigo Duterte appointed Arroyo as presidential adviser on Clark programs and projects.

House of Representatives (2022–present)

Arroyo came out of retirement to seek a comeback to the House of Representatives in 2022, running unopposed for the 2nd district of Pampanga. Her legal counsel, Peter Paul Magalang, filed the certificate of candidacy on her behalf. She has declared support to the candidacies of Bongbong Marcos for president and new Lakas party-mate Sara Duterte for vice president. She also joined the caravans and campaign sorties of their UniTeam Alliance.

On May 10, 2022, Arroyo was proclaimed as representative of the 2nd district of Pampanga, succeeding her son Mikey once again for a fourth nonconsecutive term. Although she assumed office on June 30, 2022, she took her oath of office on May 26 in Lubao and on June 13 before outgoing President Rodrigo Duterte at the Malacañang Palace. Arroyo said she will join her fellow representatives in passing the legislative agenda of the administration of President Bongbong Marcos and will continue to push for projects aligned with the Pampanga Megalopolis program.

On July 25, 2022, Arroyo was named as Senior Deputy Speaker of the House of Representatives under the new speakership of Martin Romualdez, her Lakas party-mate whom she endorsed for the position, in the 19th Congress of the Philippines.

Scouting
Arroyo was a chief girl scout of the Girl Scouts of the Philippines.

Government and political titles

 Undersecretary of Trade and Industry (1987–1992)
 Senator (1992–1998)
 Secretary of Social Welfare and Development (1998–2000)
 Vice President of the Philippines (1998–2001)
 President of the Philippines (2001–2010)
 Representative (2010–2019; 2022–present)
 Speaker of the House of Representatives of the Philippines (2018–2019)

Approval ratings

In July 2008, the Social Weather Stations (SWS) said that Arroyo registered a net satisfaction rating of minus 38 in a survey conducted in the last week of June, making her the most unpopular president in the country since democracy was restored in 1986.

Honors and awards

Foreign honors
 :
 Knight Grand Cross with Collar of the Family Order of Laila Utama
 :
 Grand Cross of the Order of Merit of Duarte, Sánchez and Mella Special Class
 :
 Grand Cross of the Order of Independence
 
:
 Knight of the Decoration of Honour
 :
 Grand Cordon of the Order of the Chrysanthemum
 :
 Grand Cross with Collar of the Order of the Star of Romania
 :
 Collar of the Order of Isabella the Catholic

Honorary degrees
 Honorary Doctor of Laws degree from La Trobe University in Australia (2000)
Honorary Doctor of Laws degree from Waseda University in Tokyo, Japan (2002)
 Honorary Doctor of Laws degree from Old Dominion University in Virginia, United States (2003)
Honorary Doctor of Laws degree from Fordham University (2003)
 Honorary Doctor of Humane Letters degree from University of San Francisco in California, United States (2004)
 Honorary Doctor of Humanities degree from Mapua Institute of Technology in Manila, Philippines (2004)
Honorary Doctor of Laws degree from Kyungsung University in Pusan, South Korea (2005)
 Honorary Doctor of Laws degree from Chulalongkorn University in Bangkok, Thailand

Recognitions
 Time magazine's "People Who Mattered" list for 2005 
 Forbes magazine's 100 Most Powerful Woman in the World (from 2004 to 2009) – she ranked 4th in the 2005 list
 Member, Council of Women World Leaders
 Don Quijote International Award (category: mejor labor institucional – Best institutional work) from Spain's King Juan Carlos (April 15, 2010)
Teodora Alonzo Award by the Philippine Order of the Knights of Rizal
 Fourth Patron of the Royal Institution Singapore, an unaccredited institution of higher learning

References

External links

 House Of Representatives – The 15th Congress – Member Profile
 President Gloria Macapagal Arroyo official website 
 Reporter's Notebook: Ang Palasyo Reporter's Notebook Special, December 4, 2007
 Interactive timeline: The life of Gloria Arroyo, by abs-cbnNEWS.com

 
1947 births
Gloria
Assumption College San Lorenzo alumni
Ateneo de Manila University alumni
Academic staff of Ateneo de Manila University
Children of presidents of the Philippines
Collars of the Order of Isabella the Catholic
Deputy Speakers of the House of Representatives of the Philippines
Estrada administration cabinet members
Walsh School of Foreign Service alumni
Female defence ministers
Female foreign ministers
Female heads of government
Female heads of state
20th-century Filipino economists
Filipino women diplomats
Heads of government who were later imprisoned
Filipino politicians convicted of crimes
Ilocano people
Filipino Roman Catholics
Kabalikat ng Malayang Pilipino politicians
Knights Grand Cross of the Order of Isabella the Catholic
Laban ng Demokratikong Pilipino politicians
Lakas–CMD (1991) politicians
Lakas–CMD politicians
Living people
Gloria
Members of the House of Representatives of the Philippines from Pampanga
PDP–Laban politicians
People from Pampanga
People from Quezon City
Kapampangan people
Order of Merit of Duarte, Sánchez and Mella
People with endocrine, nutritional and metabolic diseases
Candidates in the 2004 Philippine presidential election
Candidates in the 1998 Philippine vice-presidential election
Presidents of the Philippines
Recipients of the Order of Isabella the Catholic
First Class of the Order of the Star of Romania
Scouting in the Philippines
Secretaries of Foreign Affairs of the Philippines
Secretaries of National Defense of the Philippines
Secretaries of Social Welfare and Development of the Philippines
Senators of the 9th Congress of the Philippines
Senators of the 10th Congress of the Philippines
Speakers of the House of Representatives of the Philippines
University of the Philippines Diliman alumni
Vice presidents of the Philippines
Women presidents
Women members of the House of Representatives of the Philippines
Women members of the Senate of the Philippines
Women members of the Cabinet of the Philippines
Filipino politicians convicted of corruption
20th-century Filipino women politicians
20th-century Filipino politicians
21st-century Filipino women politicians
21st-century Filipino politicians
Women vice presidents
Women legislative speakers
Corazon Aquino administration personnel